Erdem Tumenovych Tsydypov (Russian: Эрдэм Тумэнович Цыдыпов, born 30 May 1997) is a Russian archer. He won the bronze medal in the men's recurve event at the 2022 European Indoor Archery Championships held in Laško, Slovenia.

He represented Russia at the 2019 Summer Universiade held in Naples, Italy and he won the silver medal in the men's individual recurve event. He also won the gold medal in the mixed team event. In 2019, he also won the gold medal in the mixed team event at the Military World Games held in Wuhan, China, alongside Inna Stepanova.

References

External links 
 

Living people
1997 births
Place of birth missing (living people)
Russian male archers
Universiade medalists in archery
Universiade gold medalists for Russia
Universiade silver medalists for Russia
Medalists at the 2019 Summer Universiade
21st-century Russian people